Li Shuai (born 18 June 1995) is a Chinese footballer.

Club career
Li Shuai joined China League One side Dalian Yifang (now known as Dalian Professional) on 5 January 2016. He made his senior debut on 12 March 2016 in a 2–0 home win over Zhejiang Yiteng. On 9 April 2017, he scored his first senior goal in a 2–1 home win against Qingdao Huanghai. He played 16 league matches for the club as Dalian Yifang won the title of the league and promoted to the first tier.

Li was linked with Jiangsu Suning, Tianjin Quanjian and Guangzhou Evergrande in the 2018 winter transfer window. However, his former club Changchun Yatai submitted a claim to the Chinese Football Association for his ownership in January 2018 and held back his further transfer. He stayed at Dalian Yifang and made his Super League debut on 3 March 2018 in an 8–0 crushing defeat against Shanghai SIPG, coming on for Wang Jinxian in the 66th minute. On 14 September 2018, he scored his first first-tier league goal in a 1–0 win over Tianjin Quanjian to secure Dalian's first away victory of the season.

International career

Li was called up to the China national team by Marcello Lippi in September 2019, but did not have his first appearance until the 10 October 2019 match against Guam.

Career statistics

Club statistics
.

International statistics

Honours

Club
Dalian Professional
China League One: 2017

References

External links
 

1995 births
Living people
Chinese footballers
Footballers from Shenyang
Dalian Professional F.C. players
Chinese Super League players
China League One players
Association football defenders